Yucca schidigera, also known as the Mojave yucca or Spanish dagger, is a flowering plant native to the southwest deserts of North America.

Description

The bark is gray-brown, being covered with brown dead leaves near the top, becoming irregularly rough and scaly-to-ridged closer to the ground.

Distribution and habitat 
The plant is native to the Mojave Desert, Chihuahuan Desert and Sonoran Desert of southeastern California, Baja California, New Mexico, southern Nevada and Arizona.

They thrive in full sun and in soil with excellent drainage. It also needs no summer water. It is related to the banana yucca (Y. baccata), which occurs in the same general area; hybrids between the two are sometimes found.

Fire ecology 

Post fire, the Mojave yucca produces sprouts eagerly and the regeneration of the seedlings are witnessed. The fire regime is defined predominantly by heavy crop vegetation that take part in carrying the fire in the ecosystem. Over time, the invasive species that have been introduced to the ecosystem, such as grasses, have turned more fire tolerant, increasing the fire frequency and altering the fire regime that existed in the past.

Early accounts describe the flora of the Mojave Desert as arid grassland and shrubland communities. This ecosystem depended on winter precipitation. Y. schidigera was tolerant of this fire regime and rarely harmed. However, the introduction of nonnative grasses led to a higher frequency of fire, which decreased the survival rate of Y. schidigera.

Uses 
Moths gather pollen from the flowers and deposit it on the stigma of a flower, the ovary of which they lay their eggs in; the larvae eat of the fruit capsule as it grows, but leave behind some seeds to develop into fruit.

The fibers of the Yucca schidigera leaves are used by Native Americans to make rope, cloth, thread, and sandals. The flowers and fruit are eaten either raw or roasted, and the black seeds were ground into a flour. The roots are used to make soap.
Some reports claim that Native Americans wash their hair with yucca to fight dandruff and hair loss. Among the other maladies this yucca has been used to treat are headaches, bleeding, gonorrhea, arthritis and rheumatism.

Currently, extracts from this plant are in animal feed and various herbal medications. The rigid flower stalk of the yucca, after maturation, is used as a substitute for eucalyptus stems or logs to make didgeridoos. It is also used as a natural deodorizer, and is used in pet deodorizers. Steroid saponins are produced commercially from Y. schidigera that can be used as naturally derived food-grade surfactant. Y. schidigera is an ingredient that is found in a quarter of dog food sold. It is mainly included in their food to reduce the waste odor of most pets.

Researchers have also found that the ingestion of Y. schidigera have decreased the blood cholesterol of human and chickens, increased vitamin and mineral absorption in animals, and increased cattle reproduction.

In fish, Yucca schidigera extract is beneficial. It can improve the growth rate in fish as a result of increased protein metabolism, requiring less food to sustain populations of fish. Outside of boosted growth rates, Yucca schidigera can also be used to improve the health of fish as it reduces ammonia that may be present in the water, generally improving the water quality. Evidence also suggests that Yucca schidigera is a suitable substitute in enabling fish to fight off the many diseases that characterize aquaculture.

References

 Fritz Hochstätter (ed.):  Yucca (Agavaceae). Band 1 Dehiscent-fruited species in the Southwest and Midwest of the USA, Canada and Baja California , Selbst Verlag, 2000. 
 Fritz Hochstätter (ed.):  Yucca (Agavaceae). Band 2 Indehiscent-fruited species in the Southwest, Midwest and East of the USA, Selbst Verlag. 2002. 
 Fritz Hochstätter (ed.):  Yucca (Agavaceae). Band 3 Mexico , Selbst Verlag, 2004.

External links

Flora of North America: Yucca schidigera
Jepson Flora Project: Yucca schidigera
Desert USA entry for Mojave Yucca
 Common names of yucca species
Additional info on the Mojave Yucca

schidigera
Flora of Baja California
Flora of New Mexico
Flora of the Southwestern United States
Flora of the Sonoran Deserts
Flora of the California desert regions
Natural history of the California chaparral and woodlands
Natural history of the Channel Islands of California
Natural history of the Colorado Desert
Natural history of the Mojave Desert
Natural history of the Peninsular Ranges
Natural history of the Santa Monica Mountains
Natural history of the Transverse Ranges
Plants described in 1871
Fiber plants
Plants used in traditional Native American medicine